Deçan Municipality or Dečani Municipality (Opština Dečani) is a municipality located in the District of Gjakova of Kosovo. The seat is the town of Deçan. According to the 2011 census, the municipality has 40,019 inhabitants, with 3,803 inhabitants in the town of Deçan.

It is a mountainous area which borders Montenegro and Albania. There is a total of 37 settlements in the municipality.

During the 1998–1999 war, Deçan was one of the strongholds of the Kosovo Liberation Army (KLA) and subsequently suffered a large amount of infrastructure destruction by the Serbian police and paramilitary forces. Much reconstruction has taken place with the assistance of the international agencies and support from the Kosovo Albanian diaspora.

Geography

Deçan lies in the Bjeshkët e Nemuna mountain range, part of Albanian Alps. It is surrounded by the Beleg Mountain.

List of settlements 

List of settlements:

History

Middle Ages
The 1330 chrisobull of Deçan mentions many Albanian anthroponyms throughout Kosovo, including the villages of Isniq and Gramaçel in the Deçan municipality, attesting to Albanian presence in the area during the Middle Ages. A chrisobull of the Serbian Tsar Stefan Dušan that was given to the Monastery of Saint Mihail and Gavril in Prizren between the years of 1348-1353 states the presence of Albanians in the Plains of Dukagjin, and Albanians were mentioned as farmers in the great feud of Deçan. Entire Albanian villages were gifted by Serbian kings, particularly Stefan Dušan, as presents to the Serbian monastery of Deçan, as well as those of Prizren and Tetova. Serbian historian Stanojević would discover that, in the charters of Deçan, there were several cases where a father had an Albanian name and his son would have a Serbian name. This highlights the process of the Slavic assimilation of Albanians in these areas during the reign of the various Serbian emperors.

Demographics

According to the 2011 census results, the population of the municipality numbered 40,019 inhabitants. The municipality has an ethnic Albanian majority, with other minority groups including Serbs, Bosniaks, Ashkali, Egyptians and Roma. The non-Albanian communities mainly reside in the villages of Babaloq, Dubovik, Gllogjan, Gramaçel, Posar, Rastavica and Shaptej. There are Serbian Orthodox clergy in the Visoki Dečani monastery.

Culture

Visoki Dečani monastery 

The Serbian Orthodox monastery Visoki Dečani, located near the town, is 36 meters by 24 meters with a tower 29 meters high. It was built between 1327 and 1335 by the medieval king Stefan Uroš III Dečanski of Serbia, and was dedicated to the Ascension of the Lord. The monastery is situated in the valley of the Deçan's Lumbardh river, surrounded by the mountains and forests of the Bjeshket e Nemuna mountain range. It is regarded as the largest and best preserved medieval monastery in Kosovo. The founding charter of the monastery is dated 1330. Following his death, King Stefan Uroš was buried at the monastery, which henceforth became his popular shrine. The epithet 'Dečanski' refers to Deçan. Construction was continued by his son Emperor Stefan Uroš IV Dušan until 1335, but the wall-painting was not completed until 1350. 

During the Middle Ages, entire Albanian villages were gifted by Serbian kings, particularly Stefan Dušan, as presents to the Serbian monastery of Deçan, as well as those of Prizren and Tetova.

Visoki Dečani was declared a Monument of Culture of Exceptional Importance in 1990, and was protected by the former Federal Republic of Yugoslavia. In 2004, UNESCO listed the monastery on the World Heritage List, citing its frescoes as "one of the most valued examples of the so-called Palaeologan renaissance in Byzantine painting" and "a valuable record of the life in the 14th century" and is protected by UNMIK/KFOR.

Notable people
Aferdita Kameraj, footballer
Ramush Haradinaj, former officer and leader of the Kosovo Liberation Army (KLA/UÇK), and the former Prime Minister of Republic of Kosovo
Azem Maksutaj, kickboxer
Kosta Pećanac, Chetnik commander
Valmir Berisha, footballer
Ramiz Tafilaj, businessman, philanthropist, activist, and publisher
Drilon Berisha

Twin towns – sister cities

Deçan is twinned with:
  Carsoli, Italy
  Trani, Italy
  Plav, Montenegro
  Ulcinj, Montenegro

See also 
District of Gjakova

Notes

References 

OSCE Organization for Security and Co-operation in Europe: mik/2005/02/1181_en.pdf
PTK – Post and Telecommunictions of Kosovo, J.S.C:KodePostare.pdf
ENKEO Electronic Network of Kosovar Environmental Organization: decani.pdf
 IFLA  –  International Federation of Library Associations and Institutions: kosorepo.htm#_Toc480784381

External links 

Municipality of Deçan – official site
OSCE Municipal Profile of Deçan
Visoki Dečani Monastery, Serbian Orthodox Church
BBC World radio documentary – heritage: the balkans

Municipalities of Kosovo